There are currently eight universities operating in Wales, all of which receive funding from the Higher Education Funding Council for Wales (HEFCW). Although university status in Wales only requires taught degree awarding powers (since 2004), most Welsh universities have the power to award both taught and research degrees (research degrees at Wrexham Glyndŵr University are validated by the University of Chester). University status in Wales is conferred by the Privy Council following advice from the Quality Assurance Agency for Higher Education. The criteria for university status were set by the UK government in 2004; since then higher education in Wales has become a devolved matter under the Government of Wales Act 2006 and is the responsibility of the Minister for Education & Skills in the Welsh Government.

In 2022–23 global rankings, three Welsh universities (Bangor, Cardiff and Swansea) featured in all three of the major global rankings: the Academic Ranking of World Universities, the QS World University Rankings, and the Times Higher Education World University Rankings. No Welsh university features in the top 100 of any of the global tables, although Cardiff makes the top 200 in all three and also places within the top 40 universities of all three major domestic rankings.

All Welsh universities are public universities and funded in part by the Welsh Government through HEFCW, with an allocation of just over £217 million in 2022-23. Welsh universities also charge tuition fees capped at £9,000 per year for UK students, unlike other parts of the UK which have fees capped at £9,250, on undergraduate courses. In 2021–22, approximately 149,000 students studied at universities or institutes of higher education in Wales, 25,090 of which are international students. Welsh universities generate over £5.3 billion for the Welsh economy.

Universities

Funding and finances

The total consolidated annual income for Welsh universities for 2020–21 was £1.78 billion of which £230.0 million was from research grants and contracts, with an operating surplus of £74.2 million. £332.2 million was received from the Higher Education Funding Council for Wales via grants and £356.7 million was received from tuition fees of Home-domiciled students. The table below is a record of each university's financial data for the 2020–21 financial year as recorded by the Higher Education Statistics Agency:

Research Excellence Framework

The below lists the outcome of the latest Research Excellence Framework undertaken in 2021 (the next REF is scheduled for 2028) by the four UK higher education funding bodies. The quality of research was rated 4* (world leading), 3* (internationally excellent), 2* (recognised internationally), 1* (recognised nationally) and unclassified. GPA measures the quality of research and Research Power is calculated by the GPA score of a university multiplied by the full-time equivalent number of researchers submitted. The rankings are out of 129 institutions across the UK:

Rankings

The following table is a list of Welsh universities by their performance in the three main domestic and three main global university rankings.

See also
Armorial of UK universities
Education in Wales
List of further education colleges in Wales

References 

Wales
Uni
Uni
Universities